Emilio Sánchez Perrier (1855-1907) was a Spanish landscape painter and watercolorist who also painted Orientalist subjects.

Life and career

Sánchez Perrier painted landscapes, architectures, genre and water scenes, and was renowned for his scenic illustrations of Venice.

Sánchez Perrier was a student at the school of Fine Arts in Seville and later at the school of Fine Arts in Madrid. In 1871 he resided in Granada, where he befriended Mariano Fortuny. He traveled to Paris in 1879 and studied at the studios of Auguste Bolard, Jean-Léon Gérôme and Félix Ziem.

Selected paintings

See also
 List of Orientalist artists
 Orientalism

References

External links

Sanchez Perrier Paintings at Art Renewal Center

1855 births
1907 deaths
19th-century Spanish painters
19th-century Spanish male artists
Spanish male painters
20th-century Spanish painters
20th-century Spanish male artists
Painters from Seville
Orientalist painters